Candy Eyed is the second studio album by American singer-songwriter Katy Rose. It was released digitally on June 4, 2007, by River Jones Music, being Rose's only release with the label.

Track listing

References

2007 albums
Katy Rose albums